The painter Francis Bacon  was largely self-taught as an artist. As well as other visual artists, Bacon drew inspiration from the poems of T. S. Eliot, Ezra Pound and Yeats, the plays of Aeschylus, Sophocles and Shakespeare; Proust and Joyce's Ulysses.

Influences
Pablo Picasso, in particular the biomorphic figures in Picasso's paintings of bathers at Dinard of 1927–32.
Diego Velázquez's portrait of Pope Innocent X (1649–50). "that Velázquez is one of the great paintings of the world, of course – well, I was very obsessed with that Velázquez and, of course, I made a great mistake…". Bacon painted several versions, of which Figure with Meat (1954) is an atypically Grand Guignol example. Though he visited Rome, where the painting is on display at the Doria Pamphilj Gallery, Bacon never saw the original Velázquez.
Vincent van Gogh; Bacon painted several variations of van Gogh's The Painter on the Road to Tarascon in the late 1950s.
Rembrandt Self-portrait (Musée Granet, Aix-en-Provence)
Chaïm Soutine Céret period (1919–1923), Carcass of Beef (1926) (Minneapolis)
John Constable – the full size oil-sketch for The Leaping Horse at the V&A.
Titian Portrait of Cardinal Filippo Archinto (c.1551–1562)
Francisco Goya's Black Paintings, although Bacon saw a meanness of spirit in Goya's work that he believed removed him from the front rank of great painters.
Michelangelo's drawings
Henri Matisse's Bathers by a River (1909–16)
Pharonic Egyptian sculpture of the Eighteenth dynasty, from the rule of Amenophis III and Amenophis IV especially.
Masaccio Trinity c.1424–1428 Santa Maria Novella—Bacon greatly admired Masaccio and similarities between the composition of Trinity and Painting (1946) have been noted by critics.
Jean Auguste Dominique Ingres Oedipus and the Sphinx (1826–1827), Le Bain Turc (1859–1863)
Edgar Degas After the Bath, Woman drying herself (1888–1892), Beach Scene (1868–1877)—Both in the collection of the National Gallery, London
Walter Sickert Granby Street (1912–1913)
Henri Michaux Untitled (1962)
Pierre Bonnard
Georges-Pierre Seurat
Cimabue "You know the great Cimabue Crucifixion? I always think of that as an image – as a worm crawling down the cross."<ref>Richardson, John. "Tragedian". New York Review of Books, Volume 4, Number 4. 25 March 1965. Retrieved on 1 July 2009.</ref>
Alberto Giacometti's drawings
Matthias Grünewald's Isenheim AltarpieceJulia Margaret Cameron
Étienne-Jules Marey
Eadweard Muybridge "My principal source of visual information is Muybridge, the 19th-century photographer who photographed human and animal movement. His work is unbelievably precise. He created a visual dictionary of movement, a living dictionary."
Nadar
John Deakin. Regular at the Colony Room Club and noted photographer who took portraits of Bacons friends on which many of his 1960s paintings were based.
Luis Buñuel. "I've been very influenced by the films of Buñuel, especially Un chien andalou because I think that Buñuel had a remarkable precision of imagery. I can't say how they have directly affected me but they certainly have affected my whole attitude to visual things – in the acuteness of the visual image which you've got to make."
Sergei Eisenstein. Strike (Стачка, 1925) and The Battleship Potemkin'' (Броненосец „Потёмкин“, 1925). Often reproduced the scream of the nurse from the Odessa Steps scene.

Notes

External links

Select work
 Chaim Soutine Carcass of Beef (1926) (The Minneapolis Institute of Arts)
 Degas, Hilaire-Germain-Edgar Beach Scene (1868–77) (NG London)
 Degas After the Bath, Woman drying herself (1888–1892) (NG London)
 Rembrandt Self-portrait (Musée Granet, Aix-en-Provence)

Bacon, Francis
Bacon